Pablo Martín Batalla (born January 16, 1984), is an Argentine football midfielder who plays for Deportivo Roca where he also works as a sporting director.

Career
Batalla started his career with Club Atlético Vélez Sársfield in 2003, he has had two spells with the club, also playing for C.F. Pachuca in Mexico and for Quilmes Atlético Club during their relegation season in Clausura 2007.

Batalla signed for Bursaspor for the start of the Turkish Super League 2009–2010 season.

On 19 February 2014, Batalla transferred to Chinese Super League side Beijing Guoan but returned to Bursaspor in late January 2016. He scored his first goal at the 2015–16 season of the Süper Lig against Eskişehirspor on 27 February 2016.

Later career
In August 2019, Batalla returned to Deportivo Roca as a sporting director and player. He got his debut as a player on 9 September 2019.

Club

Honours
Vélez Sársfield
 Primera División Argentina (1): 2005 Clausura

Bursaspor
 Süper Lig (1): 2009–2010

Notes

References

External links
 
 Argentine Primera statistics at Futbolxxi.com  
 Profile at BDFA 

1984 births
Living people
Argentine footballers
Footballers from Córdoba, Argentina
Argentine expatriate footballers
Association football midfielders
Club Atlético Vélez Sarsfield footballers
C.F. Pachuca players
Quilmes Atlético Club footballers
Club de Gimnasia y Esgrima La Plata footballers
Deportivo Cali footballers
Bursaspor footballers
Beijing Guoan F.C. players
Deportivo Roca players
Categoría Primera A players
Argentine Primera División players
Süper Lig players
Chinese Super League players
Argentine expatriate sportspeople in Colombia
Argentine expatriate sportspeople in Mexico
Argentine expatriate sportspeople in China
Argentine expatriate sportspeople in Turkey
Expatriate footballers in China
Expatriate footballers in Mexico
Expatriate footballers in Turkey
Expatriate footballers in Colombia